Arthur E. Wolstenholme (14 May 1889 – 1958) was an English professional footballer who played as an inside forward. He was predominantly used as an inside-right, but could also play at inside-left if required. In a career spanning 17 years, he played for a number of Football League teams, in addition to spells in the Southern Football League with Gillingham and Norwich City. Wolstenholme was the first player ever to score four goals in a Football League Third Division North fixture.

Biography
Arthur Wolstenholme was born in Middleton near Manchester on 14 May 1889. After his football career ended, he returned to Manchester, where he died in early 1958, at the age of 68.

Career
Wolstenholme played junior football with Tonge until the age of 18 before joining Football League Second Division club Oldham Athletic towards the end of the 1907–08 season. The following campaign, he became more of a first-team regular, scoring 10 goals in 26 league appearances as the team finished sixth in the division. In 1909–10 he played a further two matches for Oldham before being signed by Blackpool on a free transfer in December 1909. He made his debut for the Seasiders on 8 January, in a 2–1 defeat at Wolverhampton Wanderers. He made a further eight appearances for Blackpool during their 1909–10 campaign, and scored his first League goal for the club in a 3–0 victory at West Bromwich Albion on 16 April. His first overall goal, however, came in their FA Cup first-round tie with Barnsley at Bloomfield Road on New Year's Day.

The following season, 1910–11, Wolstenholme appeared in all but two of Blackpool's League and FA Cup games. He scored four goals, all in the former competition, as the club finished seventh in Division Two. In 1911–12, Wolstenholme made 31 League appearances and scored nine goals and finished the season as the club's top scorer. Three of these goals were in single-goal victories: at home to Chelsea on 25 November; at home to Bristol City two games later, on 9 December; and against Wolves on 17 April, again at Bloomfield Road. He scored again in the FA Cup, against Crewe Alexandra in the first of two first-round replays on 22 January. Wolstenholme's final appearance for the club occurred in the penultimate League game, a 4–1 defeat at Chelsea on 22 April. In total for Blackpool, he made 81 appearances and scored fifteen goals.

In August 1912, he joined Southern Football League outfit Gillingham. He made his debut in the club's first match of the 1912–13 season, its first after a change of name from New Brompton, and was a regular in the team for the first two-thirds of the season, but did not play again after 1 March 1913. He made 24 Southern League appearances for the club and scored 4 goals, in a season in which Gillingham scored the lowest number of goals in the division. He next moved to Norwich City in July of the following year. Wolstenholme again changed clubs in the summer of 1914, returning to the Football League with Lincoln City. He netted seven times in 30 appearances for the Imps before competitive football in England was halted by the First World War. In 1915, he rejoined his first club, Oldham Athletic, as a wartime guest player. When league football resumed in 1919, Wolstenholme re-signed for the club permanently for a transfer fee of £75. He scored twice in 22 league matches, and was released at the end of the 1919–20 campaign. He subsequently joined Football League Third Division side Newport County in June 1920, where he made 29 league appearances and scored seven goals. In the summer of 1921, he moved to Darlington on a free transfer. During the side's 7–0 win over Chesterfield on 10 September 1921, Wolstenholme became the first player ever to score four times in a Football League Third Division North match. He ended the season with a tally of 17 goals in 29 league appearances, helping Darlington to a second-place finish in the division behind Stockport County.

Despite his goalscoring exploits with Darlington, Wolstenholme was released in the summer of 1922. He was quickly signed by Nelson manager David Wilson, who had played with Wolstenholme during his time at Oldham Athletic. He made his debut for Nelson in the 2–6 defeat to Bradford Park Avenue on 26 August 1922 and scored his first goal for the club in the 1–3 loss to Ashington on 7 October 1922. Wolstenholme netted a hat-trick in the 3–0 victory against his old club Darlington on 23 December 1922 to keep Nelson top of the league after 16 matches of the season. He ended the 1922–23 season on 13 goals as the team were crowned champions of the Third Division North, and won promotion to the Second Division for the first time in their history. He was on the scoresheet twice in the following campaign, against Stockport County and Blackpool, but could not prevent Nelson returning to the third tier after finishing 21st in the division. Wolstenholme was given a coaching role in 1924, but continued to make sporadic appearances for the first-team, scoring two goals in seven matches in the 1924–25 season. His final professional appearance came on 7 February 1925, in Nelson's 4–1 win over Tranmere Rovers at Seedhill. After leaving Nelson in the summer of 1925, Wolstenholme had a short spell in non-league football with Colne Town before retiring from football completely in 1926.

Career statistics

Honours
Nelson:
Football League Third Division North: 1922–23

References

Bibliography

1889 births
1958 deaths
People from Middleton, Greater Manchester
English footballers
Association football forwards
Oldham Athletic A.F.C. players
Blackpool F.C. players
Gillingham F.C. players
Norwich City F.C. players
Lincoln City F.C. players
Newport County A.F.C. players
Darlington F.C. players
Nelson F.C. players
English Football League players
Colne Town F.C. players